Clive Colbridge is a footballer who played as a winger in the Football League for York City, Workington, Crewe Alexandra, Manchester City and Wrexham.

References

1934 births
Living people
Footballers from Kingston upon Hull
Association football wingers
English footballers
Hull City A.F.C. players
Leeds United F.C. players
York City F.C. players
Workington A.F.C. players
Crewe Alexandra F.C. players
Manchester City F.C. players
Wrexham A.F.C. players
Altrincham F.C. players
English Football League players